Shelsley Beauchamp or Great Shelsley is a village and civil parish  north west of Worcester, in the Malvern Hills district, in the county of Worcestershire, England. In 2011 the parish had a population of 192. It is on the opposite bank of the River Teme to Shelsley Walsh. The parish touches Clifton upon Teme, Great Witley, Martley, Shelsley Kings and Shelsley Walsh. It shares a parish council with Shelsley Kings and Shelsley Walsh called the Shelsley Parish Council.

It was in the lower division of Doddingtree Hundred.

Features 
There are 23 listed buildings in Shelsley Beauchamp. Shelsley Beauchamp has a church called All Saints which is of 14th century origin.

History 
The name "Beauchamp" comes from the Beauchamps who held Shelsley Beauchamp in the 12th century.

References

External links 

 

Villages in Worcestershire
Civil parishes in Worcestershire
Malvern Hills District